Elections to the Montana House of Representatives were held on November 3, 2020.

Predictions

Results summary

Incumbents defeated in primary election
David Dunn (R-District 9), defeated by Brian Putnam (R)
Joel Krautter (R-District 35), defeated by Brandon Ler (R)
Frederick Moore (R-District 37), defeated by Jerry Schillinger (R)
Bruce Grubbs (R-District 68), defeated by Caleb Hinkle (R)
Greg DeVries (R-District 75), defeated by Marta Bertoglio (R)

Incumbents defeated in general election
Debo Powers (D-District 3), defeated by Braxton Mitchell (R)
Brad Hamlett (D-District 23), defeated by Scot Kerns (R)
Barbara Bessette (D-District 24), defeated by Steven Galloway (R)
Jasmine Krotkov (D-District 25), defeated by Steve Gist (R)
Jade Bahr (D-District 50), defeated by Mallerie Stromswold (R)

Open seats that changed parties
Casey Schreiner (D-District 26) ran for Lieutenant Governor, seat won by Jeremy Trebas (R)
Jacob Bachmeier (D-District 28) didn't seek re-election, seat won by Ed Hill (R)
Gordon Pierson (D-District 78) was term-limited and couldn't seek re-election, seat won by Gregory Frazer (R)
Tom Winter (D-District 96) ran for the U.S House, seat won by Kathy Whitman (R)

Close races
Districts where the margin of victory was under 10%:
District 96, 2.62% gain
District 23, 2.64% gain
District 25, 3.27% gain
District 28, 3.68% gain
District 48, 5.52%
District 50, 5.62% gain
District 77, 5.66%
District 26, 5.72% gain
District 51, 6.44%
District 24, 6.9% gain
District 94, 6.98%
District 84, 7.2%
District 83, 8.72%
District 78, 8.98% gain

Detailed results

Districts 1-20

District 1
Incumbent Republican Steve Gunderson has represented the 1st District since 2017.

District 2
Incumbent Republican Neil Duram has represented the 2nd district since 2019.

District 3
Incumbent Democrat Debo Powers has represented the 3rd district since her appointment on November 5, 2019. Powers lost re-election to Republican Braxton Mitchell.

District 4
Incumbent Republican Matt Regier has represented the 4th district since 2017.

District 5
Incumbent Democrat Dave Fern has represented the 5th district since 2017.

District 6
Incumbent Republican Carl Glimm has represented the 6th district since 2013. Glimm was term-limited and successfully ran for the Montana Senate. Republican Amy Regier won the open seat.

District 7
Incumbent Republican Frank Garner has represented the 7th district since 2015.

District 8
Incumbent Republican John Fuller has represented the 8th district since 2019.

District 9
Incumbent Republican David Dunn has represented the 9th district since 2019. Dunn lost re-nomination to fellow Republican Brian Putnam. Putnam won the general election.

District 10
Incumbent Republican Mark Noland has represented the 10th district since 2015.

District 11
Incumbent Republican Derek Skees has represented the 11th district since 2017.

District 12
Incumbent Republican House Speaker Greg Hertz has represented the 12th district since 2015. Hertz ran successfully for the Montana Senate and fellow Republican Linda Reksten won the open seat.

District 13
Incumbent Republican Bob Brown has represented the 13th district since 2015. Brown ran for the Montana Senate and fellow Republican Paul Fielder won the open seat.

District 14
Incumbent Republican Denley Loge has represented the 14th district since 2017.

District 15
Incumbent Democrat Marvin Weatherwax Jr. has represented the 15th district since 2019.

District 16
Incumbent Democrat Tyson Runningwolf has represented the 16th district since 2019.

District 17
Incumbent Republican Ross Fitzgerald has represented the 17th district since 2017.

District 18
Incumbent Republican Llew Jones has represented the 18th district since 2019.

District 19
Incumbent Republican Wendy McKamey has represented the 19th district since 2017.

District 20
Incumbent Republican Fred Anderson has represented the 20th district since 2017.

Districts 21-40

District 21
Incumbent Republican Ed Buttrey has represented the 21st district since 2019.

District 22
Incumbent Republican Lola Sheldon-Galloway has represented the 22nd district since 2017.

District 23
Incumbent Democrat Brad Hamlett has represented the 23rd district since 2017. He lost re-election to Republican Scot Kerns.

District 24
Incumbent Democrat Barbara Bessette has represented the 24th district since 2019. Bessette lost re-election to Republican Steven Galloway.

District 25
Incumbent Democrat Jasmine Krotkov has represented the 25th district since 2019. Krotkov lost re-election to Republican Steve Gist.

District 26
Incumbent Democrat Casey Schreiner has represented the 26th district since 2013. Schreiner was term-limited and ran for Lieutenant Governor. Former Republican 25th district representative Jeremy Trebas won the open seat.

District 27
Incumbent Republican Joshua Kassmier has represented the 27th district since 2019.

District 28
Incumbent Democrat Jacob Bachmeier has represented the 28th district since 2017. Bachmeier didn’t seek re-election and Republican Ed Hill won the open seat.

District 29
Incumbent Republican Dan Bartel has represented the 29th district since 2017.

District 30
Incumbent Republican Speaker pro tempore Wylie Galt has represented the 30th district since 2017.

District 31
Incumbent Democrat Bridget Smith has represented the 31st district since 2013. Smith was term-limited and instead ran for the Montana Senate. State Senator and former representative Frank Smith won the open seat.

District 32
Incumbent Democrat Jonathan Windy Boy has represented the 32nd district since 2017.

District 33
Incumbent Republican Casey Knudsen has represented the 33rd district since 2017.

District 34
Incumbent Republican Rhonda Knudsen has represented the 34th district since 2019.

District 35
Incumbent Republican Joel Krautter has represented the 35th district since 2019. Krautter lost re-nomination to fellow Republican Brandon Ler. Ler won the general election unopposed.

District 36
Incumbent Republican Alan Doane has represented the 36th district since 2013. Doane was term-limited and couldn’t seek re-election. Republican Bob Phalen won the open seat unopposed.

District 37
Incumbent Republican Fredrick Moore has represented the 37th district since 2019. Moore lost re-nomination to fellow Republican Jerry Schillinger. Schillinger won the general election.

District 38
Incumbent Republican Kenneth Holmlund has represented the 38th district since 2015.

District 39
Incumbent Republican Geraldine Custer has represented the 39th district since 2015.

District 40
Incumbent Republican Barry Usher has represented the 40th district since 2017.

Districts 41-60

District 41
Incumbent Democrat Rae Peppers has represented the 41st district since 2013. Peppers was term-limited and couldn’t seek re-election. Fellow Democrat Rynalea Whiteman Pena won the open seat.

District 42
Incumbent Democrat Sharon Stewart-Peregoy has represented the 42nd district since 2017.

District 43
Incumbent Republican Peggy Webb has represented the 43rd district since 2017. Webb didn’t seek re-election and Republican Kerri Seekins-Crowe won the open seat.

District 44
Incumbent Republican Larry Brewster has represented the 44th district since his appointment on March 24, 2020. Brewster was elected to a full term.

District 45
Incumbent Republican Daniel Zolnikov has represented the 45th district since 2013. Zolnikov was term-limited and couldn’t seek re-election. His wife, Katie Zolnikov won the open seat.

District 46
Incumbent Republican Bill Mercer has represented the 46th district since 2019.

District 47
Incumbent Democrat Katharin Kelker has represented the 47th district since 2015.

District 48
Incumbent Democrat Jessica Karjala has represented the 48th district since 2015.

District 49
Incumbent Democrat Emma Kerr-Carpenter has represented the 49th district since 2018.

District 50
Incumbent Democrat Jade Bahr has represented the 50th district since 2019. Bahr lost re-election to Republican Mallerie Stromswold.

District 51
Incumbent Republican Frank Fleming has represented the 51st district since 2018.

District 52
Incumbent Republican Rodney Garcia has represented the 52nd district since 2019. Garcia ran for the Montana Senate and fellow Republican Jimmy Patelis won the open seat.

District 53
Incumbent Republican Dennis Lenz has represented the 53rd district since 2017.

District 54
Incumbent Republican Terry Moore has represented the 54th district since 2019.

District 55
Incumbent Republican Vince Ricci has represented the 55th district since 2015.

District 56
Incumbent Republican Sue Vinton has represented the 56th district since 2017.

District 57
Incumbent Republican Forrest Mandeville has represented the 57th district since 2015. Mandeville ran for Secretary of State and fellow Republican Fiona Nave won the open seat.

District 58
Incumbent Republican Seth Berglee has represented the 58th district since 2015.

District 59
Incumbent Republican Alan Redfield has represented the 59th district since 2013. Redfield was term-limited and couldn’t seek re-election. Republican Marty Malone won the open seat.

District 60
Incumbent Democrat Laurie Bishop has represented the 60th district since 2017.

Districts 61-80

District 61
Incumbent Democrat Jim Hamilton has represented the 61st district and its predecessors since 2017.

District 62
Incumbent Democrat Tom Woods has represented the 62nd district since 2013. Woods was term-limited and ran for the Montana Public Service Commission. Democrat Ed Stafman won the open seat.

District 63
Incumbent Democrat Zach Brown has represented the 63rd district since 2015. Brown ran successfully for the Gallatin County Commission and fellow Democrat Alice Buckley won the open seat.

District 64
Incumbent Republican Kerry White has represented the 64th District since 2013. White was term-limited and couldn’t seek re-election. Republican Jane Gillette won the open seat.

District 65
Incumbent Democrat Christopher Pope has represented the 65th district since 2019. Pope ran for the Montana Senate and fellow Democrat Kelly Kortum won the open seat.

District 66
Incumbent Democrat Denise Hayman has represented the 66th District since 2015.

District 67
Incumbent Republican Tom Burnett has represented the 67th District since 2015. Burnett didn’t seek re-election and fellow Republican Jedediah Hinkle won the open seat.

District 68
Incumbent Republican Bruce Grubbs has represented the 68th District since 2017. Gubbs lost re-nomination to fellow Republican Caleb Hinkle. Hinkle won the general election.

District 69
Incumbent Republican Walt Sales has represented the 69th District since 2017. Sales ran successfully for the Montana Senate and fellow Republican Jennifer Carlson won the open seat.

District 70
Incumbent Republican Julie Dooling has represented the 70th District since 2019.

District 71
Incumbent Republican Ray Shaw has represented the 71st District since 2013. Shaw was term-limited and couldn’t seek re-election. Republican Kenneth Walsh won the open seat.

District 72
Incumbent Republican Tom Welch has represented the 72nd District since 2017.

District 73
Incumbent Democrat Jim Keane has represented the 73rd District since 2017.

District 74
Incumbent Democrat Derek Harvey has represented the 74th District since 2019.

District 75
Incumbent Republican Greg DeVries has represented the 75th District since 2019. DeVries lost re-nomination to fellow Republican Marta Bertoglio. Bertoglio won the general election.

District 76
Incumbent Democrat Ryan Lynch has represented the 76th district since 2013. Lynch was term-limited and he ran successfully for the Montana Senate. Democrat Donavon Hawk won the open seat.

District 77 
Incumbent Democrat Mark Sweeney has represented the 79th district since 2019. Sweeney ran successfully for the Montana Senate and Democrat Sara Novak won the open seat.

District 78
Incumbent Democrat Gordon Pierson has represented the 78th District and its predecessors since 2013. Pierson was term-limited and couldn’t seek re-election. Republican Gregory Frazer won the open seat.

District 79
Incumbent Democrat Robert Farris-Olsen has represented the 79th district since 2019.

District 80
Incumbent Republican Becky Beard has represented the 80th District since 2017.

Districts 81-100

District 81
Incumbent Democrat Mary Caferro has represented the 81st District since 2019.

District 82
Incumbent Democrat Moffie Funk has represented the 82nd district since 2015.

District 83
Incumbent Democrat Kim Abbott has represented the 83rd district since 2017.

District 84
Incumbent Democrat Mary Ann Dunwell has represented the 84th District since 2015.

District 85
Incumbent Republican Theresa Manzella has represented the 85th District since 2015. Manzella ran for the Montana Senate and Republican Michele Binkley won the open seat.

District 86
Incumbent Republican David Bedey has represented the 86th District since 2019.

District 87
Incumbent Republican Nancy Ballance has represented the 87th District since 2013. Ballance was term-limited and she ran unsuccessfully for the Montana Senate. Republican Ron Marshall won the open seat.

District 88
Incumbent Republican Sharon Greef has represented the 88th District since 2019.

District 89
Incumbent Democrat Katie Sullivan has represented the 89th District since 2019.

District 90
Incumbent Democrat Marilyn Marler has represented the 90th District since 2019.

District 91
Incumbent Democrat Connie Keogh has represented the 91st District since 2019.

District 92
Incumbent Republican Mike Hopkins has represented the 92nd District since 2017.

District 93
Incumbent Republican Joe Read has represented the 93rd district since 2019.

District 94
Incumbent Democrat Kimberly Dudik has represented the 94th District and its predecessors since 2013. Dudik ran for Attorney General and Democrat Tom France won the open seat.

District 95
Incumbent Democrat Shane Morigeau has represented the 95th District since 2017. Morigeau ran for the Montana Senate and Democrat Danny Tenenbaum won the open seat.

District 96
Incumbent Democrat Tom Winter has represented the 96th District since 2019. Winter ran for the U.S House and Republican Matt Rosendale won the open seat.

District 97
Incumbent Republican Brad Tschida has represented the 97th district since 2015.

District 98
Incumbent Democrat Willis Curdy has represented the 98th district since 2015.

District 99
Incumbent Democrat Marilyn Ryan has represented the 99th District since 2017. Ryan didn’t seek re-election and Democrat Mark Thane won the open seat.

District 100
Incumbent Democrat Andrea Olsen has represented the 100th District since 2015.

References 

2020 Montana elections
Montana House
November 2020 events in the United States
Montana House of Representatives elections